Luigi Malafronte (born 2 December 1978) is an Italian former footballer who last played for Pisticci.

Biography
Born in Pompei, the Province of Naples, Malafronte started his career at S.S.C. Napoli where he made his Serie A debut in 1997–98 season.

In summer 2001, he joined A.S. Roma, signed a contract until June 2005, swapped club with Marco Quadrini directly without cash, but immediately loan to sister club Palermo. He made his club debut on 1 February 2002, against Pistoiese. He replaced Marco Aurélio in the 75th minutes, and the match the Sicily side won 2–0. Malafronte originally joined Palermo in co-ownership in July 2002. But after Franco Sensi sold the club that month, the deal was canceled. He then 3 seasons on loan at Serie C1 and C2 clubs. In summer 2005, he joined Serie C2 side Ancona. In the next season he moved to Potenza, also at Serie C2.

In 2009–10 season he was signed by Serie D side Pisticci.

References

External links
 

Italian footballers
Serie A players
Serie B players
S.S.C. Napoli players
Benevento Calcio players
Palermo F.C. players
Taranto F.C. 1927 players
Olbia Calcio 1905 players
A.C. Ancona players
Potenza S.C. players
Association football defenders
Sportspeople from the Province of Naples
1978 births
Living people
A.S.D. Paternò 1908 players
Footballers from Campania